Several ships of the Swedish Navy have been named HSwMS Mode, named after Módi, the son of Thor in Norse mythology:

  was a destroyer launched in 1902 and decommissioned in 1928 and sunk as target in 1936
  was a  launched in 1942 and decommissioned in 1970
  was a  launched in 1978 and decommissioned in 2001

Notes

References

Swedish Navy ship names